Omalogyroidea is a superfamily of minute sea snails, marine gastropod mollusks or micromollusks in the informal group Lower Heterobranchia.

Families
There are two families within the superfamily Omalogyroidea; one of them is composed entirely of extinct species:
Family Omalogyridae
 † Family Stuoraxidae

References 

Lower Heterobranchia